Panaeolus venezolanus is a species of mushroom in the Bolbitiaceae family. This species of mushroom has a cap with a diameter of 20-35 mm and has a brownish gray to ashy gray color.

See also
List of Psilocybin mushrooms
Psilocybin mushrooms
Psilocybe

References

venezolanus